Club Atlético Sporting are an Argentine Football club, their home town is Punta Alta, in the Coronel Rosales Partido of Buenos Aires Province in Argentina. They played in Argentino B until 2009 when they resigned from the league.

References

External links
 Clubsporting.com (unofficial) (Spanish)

Association football clubs established in 1925
Football clubs in Buenos Aires Province
1925 establishments in Argentina